Edgardo Pomini (8 October 1917 – 23 October 1958) was an Argentine fencer. He competed in the individual and team sabre events at the 1948 and 1952 Summer Olympics. At the fencing at the 1951 Pan American Games, he won silver in the team sabre.

References

External links
  

1917 births
1958 deaths
Argentine male fencers
Argentine sabre fencers
Olympic fencers of Argentina
Fencers at the 1948 Summer Olympics
Fencers at the 1952 Summer Olympics
Pan American Games medalists in fencing
Pan American Games silver medalists for Argentina
Fencers at the 1951 Pan American Games
20th-century Argentine people